Flirting with Anthony is a 2005 released film written and directed by Christian Calson.

Plot
Anthony is member of a gang. As a revenge for something not clearly said, he gets caught and placed by Jack and another man into a garage. Here Jack is torturing and sexually abusing Anthony. Bruno comes into the garage and is doing the same while Jack is leaving, although he comes back rescues Anthony and both starting in return torturing Bruno. They go away leaving wounded Bruno in the garage. Some times later Anthony lives together with Donna and her gay brother. While they were playing at home, Donna receives a phone call, telling her that her father died. Anthony and Donna decide to drive to the funeral. On their long journey they meet several people. For the nights, they stay in motels and have sexy plays with two male prostitutes, one called in by Anthony. The other called in on the next night by Donna. In their journey they also meet Jack; the second time at a petrol station, where Anthony and Jack have sex in the toilets. Anthony falls for Jack and decides to stay with him, while Donna decided to leave them and is driving home.

Cast
 Daniel Cartier as Anthony
 Lowe Taylor as Donna
 Linus as Jack
 Ryan A. Allen as Leroy
 Andrew Sears as Bruno (billed as Ward Montgomery)
 Mink Stole as Psychic
 Judy Tenuta as Jayleen the Motel Lady
 Brian Grillo as Tommy
 Don Allen as Johnnie
 Ruby Boofont as Ruby
 Vicky Boofont as Vicky
 Alex Garner as Colt
 Edward Hibbs as Rodney
 Heather Meyer as Mona
 Mr. Dan as Crazy Foreign Lady
 David Sivits as Sean
 Carl Strecker as Carl

Reviews
What's really going on here is Calson projecting his own sexual fantasies (bondage, jockstraps, seedy motel rooms) onto the screen, and for that you have to give him some credit. How many of us have the ambition to gather the money and people to bring our darkest desires to life right in front of our own eyes?
Flirting with Anthony is a failed experiment in combining gay sex with violent imagery.

References

External links
 Official site
 
 

2005 films
American LGBT-related films
American independent films
2000s erotic thriller films
2005 LGBT-related films
LGBT-related thriller films
American erotic thriller films
2000s English-language films
2000s American films